W. Timothy Garvey is an American endocrinologist and Butterworth Professor of Medicine in the department of Nutrition Sciences at the University of Alabama School of Medicine. He is known for his work on diabetes and is director of the medical school's Diabetes Research Center.

Education 

1974 – B.A., Washington University in St. Louis
1978 – M.D., Washington University School of Medicine
1982-1983 – Clinical and Research Fellow, University of Colorado
1983-1984 – Clinical and Research Fellow, University of California

References

External links 
 Curriculum vitae
 Faculty web page

1952 births
Living people
American endocrinologists
University of Alabama at Birmingham faculty
Washington University in St. Louis alumni
Washington University School of Medicine alumni
University of Colorado fellows
University of California, Berkeley fellows